Ahmed Kamal (born 9 April 1938) is a retired Pakistani diplomat, most noted for his work at the United Nations. He served as a professional diplomat in the Ministry of Foreign Affairs of Pakistan for close to forty years until his retirement in 1999.

Education
He is a graduate of the Paris Institute of Political Studies (better known as Sciences Po) and the Fletcher School of Law and Diplomacy at Tufts University. He was also a Carnegie Foundation Fellow at the London School of Economics. He is the author of several important publications, on disarmament, on management, on multilateralism, on global economic issues, and on the technical aspects of informatics and information technology.  He is an Honorary Visiting Professor at several universities in the United States, and a member of the board of trustees of Fairleigh Dickinson University. He has received numerous honors in Pakistan and in the other countries of his postings.

Career
During his nearly 40 year long career, he held diplomatic postings in India, Belgium, France, the Soviet Union, Saudi Arabia, the Republic of Korea, and with the United Nations both in Geneva and in New York City.

During his decade-long assignment as ambassador and permanent representative of Pakistan to the United Nations, he held many of the highest elective posts, as vice president of the General Assembly, president of the Economic and Social Council, chairman of the Consultations on the Role of NGOs at the United Nations, chairman of the Working Group on Informatics, chairman of the board of trustees of the United Nations Institute of Training and Research, and a member of the United Nations Advisory Committee on Administrative and Budgetary Questions.  He was the chief negotiator of Pakistan in the Uruguay Round negotiations which led to the establishment of the World Trade Organization. He continues to be a senior fellow of the United Nations Institute of Training and Research. He is also the Founding President and CEO of The Ambassador's Club at the United Nations.

Awards and recognition
Tamgha-e-Pakistan (Pakistan Medal) by the Government of Pakistan in 1971
Gwanghwa Medal, (Order of Diplomatic Service Merit), Government of the Republic of Korea in 1987
Medal of Honour, Kyonghi University, Republic of Korea in 1987
Honorary Doctorate in Public Administration, Myongji University, Republic of Korea in 1987

References

External links
Publications by Ambassador Ahmad Kamal on the United Nations website

1938 births
Living people
Sciences Po alumni
Alumni of the London School of Economics
People associated with the London School of Economics
Permanent Representatives of Pakistan to the United Nations
United Nations Advisory Committee on Administrative and Budgetary Questions members
The Fletcher School at Tufts University alumni
Pakistani officials of the United Nations